Paulo Godfrey is a Tanzanian football defender who plays for Young Africans.

References

Year of birth missing (living people)
Living people
Tanzanian footballers
Tanzania international footballers
Young Africans S.C. players
Association football defenders
Tanzanian Premier League players